Rangeley may refer to:

Places in the United States
Rangeley, Maine, a town
Rangeley (CDP), Maine, the primary village in the town
Rangeley Lake, a large lake in western Maine
Rangeley River, the outlet of Rangeley Lake
Rangeley Plantation, Maine, a minor civil division

People
Charles Rangeley-Wilson, British author
Walter Rangeley (1903–1982), English athlete
William H. J. Rangeley (1910-1958), British anthropologist